San Juan Bautista Valle Nacional is a town and municipality in Oaxaca in south-western Mexico. The municipality covers an area of 394.23 km² within the Sierra Juárez mountains. 
It is part of the Tuxtepec District of the Papaloapan Region.
The town lies on the north bank of the Valle Nacional River, a tributary of the Papaloapan River.

As of 2005, the municipality had a total population of 21,189.

References

Municipalities of Oaxaca
Sierra Madre de Oaxaca